Jefferson David Pinto Quiróz (born March 23, 1990) is an Ecuadorian footballer who plays as a defensive midfielder for Emelec in Serie A de Ecuador.

Club career
He came from Emelec's youth system and he is believed to be one of the most promising young players in Ecuador. He has played for Emelec for all of his career as a regular starter.

International career
Pinto received his first call-up with the national team against Haiti in a 3-1 win for Ecuador.

Honours

National team
 Ecuador U-20
 Pan American Games: Gold Medal

References

External links

1990 births
Living people
People from Buena Fe Canton
Association football midfielders
Ecuadorian footballers
Ecuador international footballers
C.S. Emelec footballers
Pan American Games competitors for Ecuador
Footballers at the 2007 Pan American Games
Medalists at the 2007 Pan American Games
Pan American Games gold medalists for Ecuador
Pan American Games medalists in football